Berit Brandth (born 1 June 1947) is a Norwegian sociologist and gender researcher.

Biography
Brandth is a graduate of Bates College in the US and the University of Trondheim (now integrated into NTNU), where she took a major in 1977. She is a professor of sociology at NTNU and a research advisor at the Norwegian Center for Rural Research. She has focused on both masculinity and femininity, with perspectives from work, technology, media and organization. One of Brandth's research themes is gender in agriculture, in relation to farm tourism and management in agricultural organizations. She has also researched the development and use of the maternity/paternity leave of absence, with particular emphasis on fathers' rights. In 2014, she was appointed as a member of the Working Time Committee, which looked at how we can best utilize the labor force in the future.

Selected works 
 2015 - Feminism and Ruralities, with Barbara Pini (Plagiarist) and Jo Little. Lexington Books. 
 2013 - Fedrekvoten og den farsvennlige velferdsstaten (editor and contributor), with Elin Kvande. Universitetsforlaget.  
 2010 - Föräldraledighet, omsorgspolitik och jämställdhet i Norden, with Gudny Bjørk Eydal, Ingolfur V. Gislason, Ann-Zofie Duvander, Johanna Lammi-Taskula, Tine Rostgaard
 2005 - Gender, Bodies and Work (editor and contributor), with David Morgan and Elin Kvande. Ashgate. 
 2005 - Valgfrihetens tid, omsorgspolitikk for barn i det fleksible arbeidsliv (editor and contributor), with Brita Bungum and Elin Kvande
 2003 - Fleksible fedre. Arbeid-Maskulinitet-Velferdsstat, with Elin Kvande. Universitetsforlaget. 
 1999 - Familie for tiden, with Kari Moxnes. Universitetsforlaget.

References

External links 
 Brandth's profile at NTNU
 Brandth's profile at Norsk senter for bygdeforskning

1947 births
Living people
Gender studies academics
Norwegian sociologists
Bates College alumni
Norwegian University of Science and Technology alumni
Academic staff of the Norwegian University of Science and Technology
20th-century non-fiction writers
20th-century Norwegian writers
20th-century Norwegian women writers
21st-century Norwegian writers
21st-century Norwegian women writers
Norwegian expatriates in the United States